Yeldari Dam, is an earthfill dam on Purna river near Yeldari in Jintur taluka of Parbhani district in the state of Maharashtra in India. It is the second largest dam in Marathwada region. Dam is renovated and developed as a big reservoir and also tourist attraction spot in Parbhani district.

Specifications

Purpose
 Irrigation
 Hydroelectricity
The dam was built between 1958 and 1968 under the observation of Yashwantrao Chavan.  It has a hydroelectric power station consisting of three units of 7.5 MW capacity each for 22.5 MW total capacity.

See also
 Dams in Maharashtra
 List of reservoirs and dams in India

References

Dams in Parbhani district
Dams completed in 1968
Earth-filled dams
1968 establishments in Maharashtra
Tourist attractions in Parbhani district